Our Lady of the Assassins (in Spanish "La virgen de los sicarios") may refer to any of the following articles:

 Our Lady of the Assassins (novel) of the Colombian writer Fernando Vallejo, published by Alfaguara, Bogotá, 1993 in Spanish.
 Our Lady of the Assassins (film), 2000, of the French director Barbet Schroeder, based in the novel by Vallejo.